Orgaz is a municipality located in the province of Toledo, Castile-La Mancha, Spain. According to the 2012 census, the municipality had a population of 2804 inhabitants, but it has since declined.

Burial of the Count of Orgaz 
The town has an association with El Greco's famous painting "The Burial of the Count of Orgaz", although the work  in question is in Toledo rather than Orgaz. It depicts Don Gonzalo Ruíz, native of Toledo and lord of the town of Orgaz.

The lords of Orgaz built the town's castle in the 14th century.

Arisgotas 
Arisgotas is a village in the municipality which is about 5km from Orgaz. It now has a population of 30, but was originally a municipality in its own right: it merged with Orgaz in the 19th century.

The name may refer to "Goths" and it is known that the Visigoths settled in the area. In the 21st century a museum of Visigothic art was established in the village.
It features spolia from the archaeological site of Los Hitos which was formerly used as a quarry by local villagers.

At Los Hitos, archaeologists have identified various Visigothic buildings including the remains of a church which was converted into a mosque during the Islamic period, which began in the 8th century.
The site fell into ruin after the conquest of Toledo by Alfonso VI of León and Castile.

References

External links 
 Official town website (in Spanish)

Municipalities in the Province of Toledo